The Hôtel Thellusson was a luxurious hôtel particulier located in Paris, France, built in 1778 by Claude-Nicolas Ledoux for Marie-Jeanne Girardot de Vermenoux (1736–1781), the widow of , a Genevan banker.

The house was situated at 30 rue de Provence, in an English garden between the rue de Provence and the rue de la Victoire. It opened on the rue de Provence with a large gate in the shape of a triumphal arch, in the "Medici style", at the end of the rue Laffitte, which at the time was called the rue d'Artois. The house was visible from the street at the end of a its drive. There was also a circular central courtyard, with a rock in the centre and a colonnade around the outside.
 
After her death in 1781, Mme Thelusson's eldest son, John Isaac de Thellusson Sorcy (1764–1828) completed the house. As they were Swiss nationals, the Thellusson family kept ownership of the hotel during the Revolution, but they returned to it only in 1797.

After the Thermidorian Reaction, there was a "victims' ball" in the hotel, for people who had had a close relative guillotined during the Revolution.

John Isaac sold the hotel in 1802 to the Prince Joachim Murat, who exchanged it in 1807 with Napoleon Bonaparte for the Hôtel de l'Élysée, which was renamed the Élysée Palace, as well as one million francs. Napoleon offered the house to Tsar Alexander Ist as the Russian Embassy in France. The tsar stayed there in 1818, and Carlo Andrea Pozzo di Borgo, adviser of the tsar, organized prestigious balls and receptions in the hotel.

The house was destroyed in 1826 when the rue Laffitte was extended to the rue de la Victoire.

Notes

Bibliography
 Gabriel Girod de l’Ain: Les Thellusson, Histoire d’une famille du XIVème siècle à nos jours. Hérissey, Évreux 1977.
 Louis-Mayeul Chaudon, Antoine-François Delandine: Dictionnaire universel, historique, critique et bibliographique. Paris 1810.
 Émile Rivoire: Bibliographie historique de Genève au XVIIIème siècle. Genf 1897.
 Herbert Lüthy: La banque protestante en France. Paris 1959-1961.

External links 

 
  Rue de Provence on the web site paris-pittoresque.com
  Rue Laffitte on the web site paris-pittoresque.com
  https://web.archive.org/web/20110530063221/http://217.128.39.98/wikiparis/index.php/Rue_de_Provence
  The hôtel Thelusson in a book "Description de Paris et de ses édifices" par J. G. Legrand, Paris, 1818

1778 establishments in France
1826 disestablishments in France
9th arrondissement of Paris
18th century in Paris
Thellusson
Houses completed in 1778
Demolished buildings and structures in Paris
19th century in Paris
Former buildings and structures in Paris
Buildings and structures demolished in 1826
Joachim Murat